Open Water Diver (OWD) is an entry-level autonomous diver certification for recreational scuba diving. Although different agencies use different names, similar entry-level courses are offered by all recreational diving agencies and consist of a combination of knowledge development (theory), confined water dives (practical training) and open water dives (experience) suitable to allow the diver to dive on open circuit scuba, in open water to a limited depth and in conditions similar to those in which the diver has been trained or later gained appropriate experience, to an acceptable level of safety.

Minimum training standard
The OWD training standard of most agencies complies with the minimum requirements of international Standard ISO 24801-2. Autonomous diver.

Agencies issuing certification named Open Water Diver

The "Open Water Diver" certification name is used by the Professional Association of Diving Instructors (PADI), Scuba Schools International (SSI),  the National Academy of Scuba Educators (NASE) Worldwide, Professional Technical and Recreational Diving (ProTec OWD) and the Sub-Aqua Association (SAA), which is recognised by the Confédération Mondiale des Activités Subaquatiques (CMAS) as a CMAS 1-star certification.

Equivalent certification issued by other agencies
The National Association of Underwater Instructors (NAUI) entry-level course is called Scuba Diver. The British Sub-Aqua Club (BSAC) calls its equivalent qualification 'Ocean Diver'.

See also

References 

Diving qualifications